Miss International Japan was created in 1960 in response to Japan's then-recent lack of finalists at the Miss International pageant.

The current Miss International Japan is Tamao Yoneyama who was crowned on November 8, 2022 in Tokyo, Japan.

History
Miss International Japan Beauty pageant has consisted of the passion and energy given by the “Goodwill Ambassadors of Beauty" from all over Japan country who aspire for "contribute to global society". This pageant is under of Miss International Organization by ICA (International Cultural Association).

The winner of Miss International Japan will be contributing at the Miss International pageant. Since 1960 participating at the pageant, Japan has only one winner, Ikumi Yoshimatsu (吉松 育美) from Tosu, Japan.

International Cultural Association
The Association was approved and founded in April 1969 (Showa 44) as an incorporated organization of the Ministry of Foreign Affairs (Cultural Exchange Division), for the purpose of "friendship and goodwill between all nations of the world" through international exchange.

Titleholders
Color key

Winners by prefectures

Controversy
In 2013 edition, for the first time in history, the winner of Miss International 2012 Ikumi Yoshimatsu of Japan did not crown her successor; instead Miss International 2008 Alejandra Andreu took over in passing on the crown to Bea Santiago of the Philippines. This is also the first time when a past winner crowned two Miss Internationals, one in 2009 where she crowned her successor, Anagabriela Espinoza of Mexico.

See also 
 Miss Universe Japan
 Miss World Japan
 Miss Earth Japan
 Miss Japan
 Miss Nippon

References

External links
Miss International Japan official website

Beauty pageants in Japan
Recurring events established in 1960
1960 establishments in Japan
Japanese awards